Lampros Vangelis (born 10 February 1982) is a retired footballer. He played as a midfielder who played defense and attacks either good. He had the ability to do some great passes and could finish off many goals with long shots.

Career
Born in Neochori, Arta, Vangelis first played for Rakoun before moving to Italian Side AC Siena. After a good season with Siena he was signed by PAOK F.C., and in 2007 he signed a two-year contract extension with the club.

Honours
 PAS Giannina
Greek Second Division: 2011

External links 
Profile at epae.org
Profile at Onsports.gr

1982 births
Living people
Greek footballers
Greece under-21 international footballers
Greek expatriate footballers
PAOK FC players
Hellas Verona F.C. players
A.C.N. Siena 1904 players
PAS Giannina F.C. players
Thrasyvoulos F.C. players
Super League Greece players
Serie A players
Serie B players
Greek expatriate sportspeople in Italy
Expatriate footballers in Italy
Association football midfielders
Footballers from Epirus (region)
People from Arta (regional unit)